Schenley Park is a large municipal park in Pittsburgh, Pennsylvania. It is located between the neighborhoods of Oakland, Greenfield, and Squirrel Hill. It is also listed on the National Register of Historic Places as a historic district. In 2011, the park was named one of  "America's Coolest City Parks" by Travel + Leisure.

The park is made up of  donated by Mary Schenley in 1889 and another  that the city subsequently purchased from her.

The park borders the campuses of Carnegie Mellon University and the University of Pittsburgh, and technically Carnegie Mellon University is actually within Schenley Park.

Facilities

Schenley Park features a grand entrance, Schenley Plaza, and several miles of hiking trails and a large pond in Panther Hollow. Across from the Phipps Conservatory is Flagstaff Hill, a popular place to watch outdoor movies in the summer.

In the early days of Schenley Park, the area known as "The Oval" was used for horse racing. Today, it has 13 tennis courts, an all weather running track, and a soccer field. There is also an ice skating rink, public swimming pool, and an 18-hole disc golf course nearby.

Schenley Park also contains the Bob O'Connor Golf Course. The golf course includes an indoor practice facility where golfers can play a "virtual" round on Pebble Beach and other famous courses.

Cross country running meets are held in the park. It is the home course for the Carnegie Mellon University men's and women's cross country teams. The 1921 USA Cross Country Championships were held in the park.

Annual events
Since 1983, Schenley Park has been home to a vintage motor sports car race, the Pittsburgh Vintage Grand Prix, that takes place annually in mid-July. Additionally, since 1993, the park has been home to the Komen Pittsburgh Race for the Cure, an annual fundraising event for breast cancer and Mother's Day tradition with more than 35,000 participants. Carnegie Mellon University's annual Spring Carnival contests its Sweepstakes, a buggy race, on Tech Avenue, Schenley Drive, and Frew Street.

History

In 1842, Mary Elizabeth Croghan of Pittsburgh, who was 15 at the time, eloped with 43-year-old Captain Edward Schenley. The couple moved to England. Mary's father attempted to terminate her inheritance in a lawsuit, but was unsuccessful. Mary's maternal grandfather, General James O'Hara, bequeathed to her a parcel of land known as the "Mt. Airy Tract."

Mary's wealth attracted the attention of several land developers in the Pittsburgh area as well as Edward Bigelow, the Director of the Department of Public Works in Pittsburgh. In 1889, Bigelow learned that the agent of a land developer planned to travel to London to attempt to purchase the land from Mary. Bigelow sent an East Liberty lawyer by train to New York City where he then boarded a steamer bound for England. The lawyer beat the real estate agent by two days.

After negotiations with Mary, Bigelow's lawyer entered into an agreement to give  of the Mt. Airy Tract to the city of Pittsburgh with an option to purchase  more, under the conditions that the park be named after her and never be sold. The city agreed and immediately purchased the additional land.

Bigelow began to develop the newly renamed Schenley Park for recreational uses. He hired William Falconer to lead the Phipps Conservatory & Botanical Gardens which was built in 1893. In 1895, Andrew Carnegie built the Carnegie Museum and Music Hall, establishing Oakland and Schenley Park as a cultural icon.

Forbes Field, the home field of the Pittsburgh Pirates, was adjacent to Schenley Park during its lifespan (1909–1970).

Recent developments
In 2001, after extensive renovations, the Schenley Park Visitor Center opened in one of the park's original buildings. The building had previously served as a tool shed, the home of the Pittsburgh Civic Garden Center, and a nature museum, until closing in the late 1980s.
In spring 2006, the Schenley Plaza area was converted to its original use as a grand entrance to Schenley Park. Although it was originally designed as a grand entrance, it had been used as a parking lot for many years. The new park area features a carousel and several small food stands.
In 2022, Judge John McVay approved the removal of the  Christopher Columbus statue in Schenley Park. The bronze and granite statue is 13-feet tall, and has stood in the park since 1958. City of Pittsburgh officials decided to remove the statue in 2020 due to Columbus’ association with racism and colonialism. The Italian Sons and Daughters of America challenged this decision, but McVay’s 2022 ruling stated that the city was free to take down the statue.

Gallery

See also
Carnegie Museums of Pittsburgh
List of Pittsburgh neighborhoods
Panther Hollow Bridge
Phipps Conservatory & Botanical Gardens
Neill Log House

Notes

References
Patricia Lowry (2006). Schenley Plaza Dedication: story by Pittsburgh Post-Gazette. Retrieved June 4, 2006.

Ben Muessig (2006). Sk8er (un)appreciation: story by Pittsburgh Tribune-Review. Retrieved February 17, 2007.

External links

 
 Schenley Park Map
 Tour of the Schenley Park's bridges
 

 
Carnegie Mellon Tartans
College cross country courses in the United States
Cross country running courses in Pennsylvania
Defunct college football venues
Historic American Buildings Survey in Pennsylvania
Historic districts on the National Register of Historic Places in Pennsylvania
Motorsport venues in Pennsylvania
Parks in Pittsburgh
Pittsburgh History & Landmarks Foundation Historic Landmarks
Pittsburgh Panthers football
Urban forests in the United States
Urban public parks
Works Progress Administration in Pennsylvania
National Register of Historic Places in Pittsburgh
1889 establishments in Pennsylvania
Protected areas established in 1889